Chattogram Government High School is a secondary school in Kotwali Thana of Chittagong, Bangladesh.

History
It was established in 1906 as Chittagong Modern English (M.E.) School. The school was converted into a government school in 1917. In 1963, the school's name was again changed to Chittagong Junior Government High School. The school was renamed to its current name in 1977.

Results
Students of Chittagong Government High School take part in three public examinations: Secondary School Certificate Examination-SSC, Junior School Certificate Examination-JSC (Formerly, Junior Scholarship Examination) and Primary School Certificate Examination-PSC (Previously, Primary Scholarship Examination).

Extra-curricular activities
These include Inter School Debate Championships, Recitation Contests, Inter School Cricket Tournaments, Inter School Football Tournaments, Math Olympiad, Science Olympiad, Physics Olympiad, Chemistry Olympiad, Biology Olympiad, Astronomy Olympiad, Astrophysics Olympiad and Science Fair.The school really cares about extra-curricular activities. 

Chittagong Government High School is one of the best schools in debating in Chittagong District. It has become champion in Drishty  Inter School Debate Contest eight times: in 1993, 1994, 1995, 2002, 2008, 2009, 2014. and 2018

Notable alumni
 Aftab Ahmed (born 1985), international cricketer
 Subir Chowdhury, Chairman and CEO of ASI Consulting Group, LLC, author, helped establish the first Center for Bangladesh Studies in the United States at the University of California, Berkeley.
 Adil Hossain Noble, Bangladeshi model
 Minar Rahman, Bangladeshi singer
 Yasir Ali Chowdhury, Bangladeshi cricketer

See also
 Education in Bangladesh

References 

1906 establishments in India
Schools in Chittagong
Public schools in Chittagong